The Walla Walla and Columbia River Railroad was a  narrow gauge railroad that operated a 46 miles (74 km) of track running east from Wallula, Washington, United States to Walla Walla, Washington. It is also known as the Rawhide or Strap Iron Railroad. The nicknames come from the early days when the rail line used wooden rails. Strap iron was placed on top of the wooden rails to improve the longevity of the rails. The strap iron was secured in place by nails. Rawhide was used when a quick repair was needed to secure a snakehead.

Further reading

References

3 ft gauge railways in the United States
Defunct Washington (state) railroads
Transportation in Walla Walla County, Washington